Diadelia basifuscomaculata is a species of beetle in the family Cerambycidae. It was described by Breuning in 1980.

References

Diadelia
Beetles described in 1980
Taxa named by Stephan von Breuning (entomologist)